Sebastian Linkemann is a German curler.

Teams

References

External links

Living people
German male curlers
Year of birth missing (living people)
20th-century German people